Paul Păcurar (born 5 March 1991) is a Romanian professional footballer who plays as a midfielder for Liga III side Metalurgistul Cugir.

Honours
CSO Cugir
Liga III: 2020–21

References

External links
 
 

1991 births
Living people
Sportspeople from Alba Iulia
Romanian footballers
Association football midfielders
Liga I players
CS Pandurii Târgu Jiu players
Liga II players
FC Botoșani players
CS Șoimii Pâncota players
CS Minaur Baia Mare (football) players
CS Luceafărul Oradea players
CS Gaz Metan Mediaș players
FC UTA Arad players
CSM Unirea Alba Iulia players